Brushwood can mean:
 Melaleuca uncinata or Broombrush
 Brushwood, New South Wales, a rural community in the central east part of the Riverina region of New South Wales, Australia
 Brian Brushwood, American magician, podcaster, author and comedian known for Scam School
 Operation Brushwood, a part of Operation Torch, Allied landings in Africa during World War II
 Brushwood Junior School in the town of Chesham, Buckinghamshire, England